Jefferson Souza (June 1908 – 1 December 1992) was a Brazilian water polo player. He competed in the men's tournament at the 1932 Summer Olympics.

References

1908 births
1992 deaths
Brazilian male water polo players
Olympic water polo players of Brazil
Water polo players at the 1932 Summer Olympics
Water polo players from Rio de Janeiro (city)
20th-century Brazilian people